In astrophysics, Toomre's stability criterion (also known as the Safronov–Toomre criterion) is a relationship between parameters of a differentially rotating, gaseous accretion disc which can be used to determine approximately whether the system is stable.  In the case of a stationary gas, the Jeans stability criterion can be used to compare the strength of gravity with that of thermal pressure.  In the case of a differentially rotating disk, the shear force can provide an additional stabilizing force.

The Toomre criterion for a disk to be stable can be expressed as,

The Toomre Q parameter is often defined as the left-hand side of Eq.,

The stability criterion can then simply be stated as,  for a disk to be stable against collapse.

The previous discussion was for a gaseous disk, but a similar analysis can be applied to a disk of stars (for example, the disk of a galaxy), yielding a kinematic Q parameter,

Background 

Many astrophysical objects result from the gravitational collapse of gaseous objects (for example, star formation occurs when molecular clouds collapse under gravity), and thus the stability of gaseous systems is of great interest.  In general, a physical system is 'stable' if: 1) It is in equilibrium (there is a balance of forces such that the system is static), and 2) small deviations from equilibrium will tend to damp out, so that the system tends to return to equilibrium.

The most basic gravitational stability analysis is the Jeans criteria, which addresses the balance between self-gravity and thermal pressure in a gas.  In terms of the two above stability conditions, the system is stable if: i) thermal pressure balances the force of gravity, and ii) if the system is compressed slightly, the outward pressure force must become stronger than the inward gravitational force - to return the system to equilibrium.  In the Jeans case, the stability criterion is size dependent, resulting in the concept of a Jeans length and Jeans mass.

The Toomre analysis, first studied by Viktor Safronov in the 1960s, considers not only gravity and pressure, but also shear forces from differential rotation.  Conceptually, if a fluid is differentially rotating (such as in the keplerian motion of an astrophysical disk), gravity not only has to overcome the internal pressure of the gas, but also needs to halt the relative motion between two parcels of fluid, allowing them to collapse together.

The analysis was expanded upon by Alar Toomre in 1964, and presented in a more general and comprehensive framework.

References 

Astrophysics